Asda Stores Ltd. (often styled as ASDA) is a British supermarket chain. Its headquarters are in Leeds, England. The company was founded in 1949 when the Asquith family merged their retail business with the Associated Dairies company of Yorkshire. It expanded into Southern England during the 1970s and 1980s, and acquired Allied Carpets, 61 large Gateway Supermarkets and other businesses, such as MFI Group. It sold these acquisitions during the 1990s to concentrate on the supermarkets. It was listed on the London Stock Exchange until 1999 when it was acquired by Walmart for £6.7 billion. Asda was the second-largest supermarket chain in the United Kingdom between 2003 and 2014 by market share, at which point it fell into third place.

Besides its core supermarkets, the company also acts as a white label payment card provider offering assistance for insurance and payment services under the Asda Money brand and also has a mobile virtual network operator.

In February 2021, the Issa brothers and TDR Capital acquired Asda. Walmart retains "an equity investment" in Asda, a seat on the board and "an ongoing commercial relationship". The deal came after an acquisition by Sainsbury's was rejected by the Competition and Markets Authority.

History

Early years
The Asquith family were butchers based in Knottingley, Wakefield, West Yorkshire. In the 1920s, they expanded their business to seven butchers shops in the area. Their sons, Peter and Fred, later became founding members of Asda.

Around the same time, a group of West Riding dairy farmers, including the Stockdale family and Craven Dairies, joined under the banner of J.W Hindell Dairy Farmers Ltd. The company diversified in 1949 to become Associated Dairies and Farm Stores Ltd, with Arthur Stockdale as the managing director.

1960s and 1970s
In 1963, the Asquith brothers converted an old cinema, the Queens in Castleford, into a self-service supermarket. Another followed in the old indoor market at Edlington. Both stores traded under the name of 'Queens'. Their next store was a purpose-built supermarket in South Elmsall, a town in which Asda has a distribution centre to this day.

In 1965, the Asquith brothers approached Associated Dairies to run the butchery departments within their small store chain. A merger was proposed and the Asquiths' business was joined with Noel Stockdale's to form a new company, Asda (Asquith + Dairies) (capitalised from 1985).

By 1967, the company had set up a store in Billingham, County Durham. By 1969, Noel Stockdale bought out the Asquith brothers' stake and became chairman of the company.

Asda took advantage of the abolition of retail price maintenance to offer large-scale, low-cost supermarkets. This was aided by the decision to acquire three struggling US-owned branches in the mid-1960s of the GEM retail group. The Government Exchange Mart stores in Preston, Lancashire, Cross Gates, Leeds and West Bridgford, Nottinghamshire, had accumulated losses of £320,000 and offered to sell the stores for 20% of whatever Asda could recoup as losses from the Inland Revenue. They received the whole amount back. The rent was only 10 shillings (50p) per square foot on a 20-year lease, with no rent reviews, Asda increased GEM's £6,000 per week sales to around £60,000 per week in just six months with the new stores named as Asda.

During the 1970s, with over 30 stores in the north of England, Asda began expanding south, with the opening of new stores in the Estover area of Plymouth, Devon and Gosport, Hampshire in 1977. In 1978, Asda acquired Allied Carpets.

In 1982, the first London store opened in Park Royal, near Ealing. The Isle of Dogs and Charlton, London stores followed on rapidly thereafter.

1980s and 1990s
In 1984, managing director, John Hardman, made attempts to halt Asda's decline, which included the introduction of Asda branded products. In 1985, Asda merged with MFI (Mullard Furniture Industries) and the group was renamed Asda-MFI Group plc.

Asda established its headquarters at "Asda House". The site was officially opened in 1988 by the then Prime Minister, Margaret Thatcher.

By the end of the 1990s, the 'Asdale'-named clothing range was replaced by the clothing ranges from the newly formed George Davies partnership with Asda.

Near bankruptcy and merger prospects
With stores mainly based in the North of England, the newly focused food retail group expanded further south in 1989 by purchasing the large format stores of rival Gateway Superstores for £705 million. This significantly increased Asda's total selling area, but the company had borrowed heavily in order to fund the purchase - city estimates suggested that Asda had overpaid by around £300 million for 61 of the largest Gateway stores, two undeveloped store sites and a distribution centre. That was far above the net book value of the locations, some of which were poorly sited. (Asda has subsequently relocated or rebuilt more than 30 of the original Gateway stores since the late 1990s.) The move left the company overstretched as a result, and by 1991, it found itself in serious financial trouble with over £1 billion of debt; compounding the situation further was a declining customer base, which was mainly caused by Asda's focus on moving upmarket resulting in prices rising to levels significantly higher than competitors.

Eventually, a combination of flagging profits, a tremendous debt and a loss of customers left Asda in such an egregious financial situation that they came very close to breaching their banking covenants; at one point, they almost entered administration. The company's first response was to change its management; chairman John Hardman was ousted in June 1991 and was replaced by Patrick Gillam, and Archie Norman was appointed chief executive in October. Asda then completed a rights issue in November 1991 that raised £357 million and cut the company's debts to £668 million. In May 1992, Asda reduced their prices back to their traditional level (5-7% below competitors) and announced that they would eliminate over 500 management positions. In 1993, Asda completed a second rights issue that raised a further £347 million and began selling off some of its assets; some stores were sold to competitors, and the Allied Carpets chain was sold to Carpetland. By 1995, the company had returned to profitability and had virtually wiped out its debt - this is cited as one of the most successful turnarounds in British retail history.

Norman succeeded Gillam as chairman upon the latter's retirement in 1996, appointing then-deputy Allan Leighton as chief executive, and began to remodel Asda's stores along the lines of Walmart, the world's largest retailer. Leighton travelled to Bentonville, Arkansas to assess and photograph the systems and marketing deployed by Walmart. In 1998, following the Walmart model, Asda began opening larger 'Hypermarket' (later 'Supercentre') stores as well as introducing pharmacies and cafes to its stores. At the same time, merger discussions were taking place between Asda and other retailers such as Safeway and Kingfisher plc; both collapsed without an agreement being reached, but in 1999, a second round of discussions with Kingfisher later reached an agreement for a £5.4 billion merger that would have both created the United Kingdom's largest multi-category retailer and enabled Asda to begin operating stores throughout Europe.

2000s and 2010s: Walmart years
A merger deal was abandoned when Walmart outbid Kingfisher to purchase Asda for £6.7 billion, which was completed on 26 July 1999 in a move that was initially speculated by British media outlets as a potential corporate raid. Shortly after the takeover, Norman resigned as chairman and left the company to pursue his political career; he was succeeded as chairman by Leighton. As Walmart were keen on entering the British Market, Bob Martin, Walmart's president of international operations, lobbied Prime Minister Tony Blair on planning issues.

In 2005, amid reported concerns within Walmart about a slippage in market share, partially due to a resurgent Sainsbury's, Asda's chief executive, Tony De Nunzio left, and was replaced by Andy Bond. In 2005, Asda expanded into Northern Ireland by purchasing 12 former Safeway stores from Morrisons.

Asda's property development arm, Gazeley Limited, was sold to Economic Zones World (EZW), a Dubai World subsidiary, in June 2008 for in excess of £300m.

In November 2008, there were reports that Asda was to buy Irish retailer Dunnes Stores.

In April 2010, Asda announced plans to open over 100 new non-food stores as part of an ambitious five-year plan. These plans were mothballed shortly after because of the recession and the reining in of spending by consumers on non-food purchases.

In August 2009, Walmart sold Asda for £6.9 billion to its Leeds-based investment subsidiary Corinth Services Limited. The deal was described as part of a "group restructuring" and meant Asda remained under the control of Walmart, since Corinth is itself a Walmart subsidiary.

On 11 May 2010, Andy Clarke, the chief operating officer, was appointed as CEO.

In May 2010, Asda bought the original Netto UK supermarket chain in a £778 million deal.

In February 2011, Asda announced the purchase of six stores from Focus DIY; five of these were converted into supermarkets later that year.

In 2015, Asda adopted Walmart's slogan: "Save Money. Live Better". Around the same time they adopted an updated logo, with four of Walmart's six yellow asterisks surrounding the first letter. This logo is still used, mainly as a secondary logo.

In June 2016, it was announced that Andy Clarke, CEO since 2010, would be replaced by Sean Clarke, the head of parent company Walmart's operations in China.

In October 2017, Asda announced that the current CEO, Sean Clarke would be replaced by Roger Burnley, the deputy CEO, from 1 January 2018, and the sixth CEO since 2000.

In November 2017, Asda recruited Jesús Lorente, from French hypermarket retailer Carrefour. He became CMO (Chief Merchandising Officer), in January 2018, and was put in charge of the fresh food and general merchandise offer within all stores. After reportedly clashing with Roger Burnley and only six months in his post, Lorente left Asda at the end of July 2018. His role was divided up between Burnley and Anthony Hemmerdinger.

Abandoned merger with Sainsbury's
In April 2018, Sainsbury's and Walmart announced negotiations about a possible merger of Sainsbury's and Asda, creating the largest supermarket chain in the UK. Under the plans, Walmart would own 42% of the combined business, which would be led by the existing chief executive of Sainsbury's, Mike Coupe. The group would also open branches of Argos within Asda stores. The merger underwent intense scrutiny by a cross-party group of MPs, chairing select committees for the proposed merger, along with the Competition and Markets Authority, investigating the impact of how the deal could negatively affect the retail industry by a possible reduction of consumer choice for shoppers resulting in price rises, and of how suppliers, especially smaller, family-owned companies could be squeezed by the combined group. The CMA were inundated with complaints by suppliers and other major retailers of the damage they felt would be inflicted upon them if the deal was approved. On 25 April 2019 the CMA blocked the proposed merger, suggesting that it would increase prices for consumers and make competition unfair for the other UK retailers, Sainsbury's then announced that it was abandoning the merger.

Acquisition by the Issa brothers and TDR Capital
In February 2021, Mohsin Issa, Zuber Issa and TDR Capital acquired Asda. Walmart retains "an equity investment" in Asda, a seat on the board and "an ongoing commercial relationship".

In February 2021, Asda said that it might need to put 5,000 jobs at risk as part of reconstruction plan in the context of people shopping online.

In March 2021, Asda was involved in the "largest ever sterling bond offering" as part of the financing package to fund the acquisition purchase by TDR Capital and the Issa brothers.

Store formats

Asda Supercentres
Following the takeover by Walmart, several "Asda Walmart Supercentres" have been opened, creating some of the largest hypermarkets in the United Kingdom. Since 2006, all new Supercentres have been solely branded as Asda Supercentre without the Walmart branding. The first Supercentre with a sales area of  opened in Patchway, Bristol in the summer of 2000. The first Scottish Supercentre opened in Livingston, in 2001. This was preceded in June 2002 by the Eastlands, Manchester store which was the largest store at the time with a sales area of  but is currently the second largest Asda Supercentre, and the third largest is located in Minworth, West Midlands, followed by Patchway. As of 31 January 2021, there are 32 Supercentres.

Asda Superstores
Asda superstores are large supermarkets with a non-food offer slightly smaller than an Asda Supercentre. As of 31 January 2021, there are 342 superstores. Most superstores have a petrol filling station and dining and refreshment facilities for shoppers such as customer cafes, and selected stores have McDonald's franchise restaurants or "Express Diners" The Old Kent Road, Scunthorpe Colindale and Brunstane stores are trialling a Subway franchise. There are currently no plans to roll the Subway franchise out across the chain.

Asda Supermarket
In May 2010, Asda announced the purchase of the 193 UK stores of Danish discount retailer Netto in a £778 million deal. But the Competition Commission made them sell off 47 of the stores to other retailers. These former Netto stores form the core of the Asda Supermarket format. As of 31 January 2021, there are 207 supermarkets.

Asda Living

In October 2003, Asda launched a new format called Asda Living. This is the company's first "general merchandise" store, containing all its non-food ranges including clothing, home electronics, toys, homewares, health, and beauty products. With these stores they have linked up with Compass Group who operate the coffee shop Living Cafe within some of the stores. The first store with this format opened in Walsall, West Midlands. As at 31 January 2021, there are 33 stores.

George stores
In 2004, the George clothing brand was extended to a number of standalone George stores on the high street; the first George standalone store to open was in Preston. In 2008, all George standalone stores were closed due to high rental costs resulting in low profitability.

In 2011, Asda announced its intention to establish a small number of pilot George stores. In January 2012 Asda announced that it had agreed to terms with two franchise partners to open international George stores. Through the agreement with SandpiperCI, based in the Channel Islands, the company will be responsible for opening George franchises in both Jersey and Guernsey, and through the Azadea Group, headquartered in Beirut, Lebanon, the George franchise stores would open in the Middle East.

Asda Essentials
In April 2006, Asda launched a new trial format called 'Asda Essentials' in Northampton, followed by another in Pontefract a month later. The stores were modelled on France's Leader Price chain, with a smaller floorplate than Asda's mainstream stores and with a primary focus on own-brand products, only stocking branded items that were perceived to be at the "core" of a family's weekly shop with the aim being to challenge the dominance of Tesco and Sainsbury's in the convenience store market while at the same time addressing competition from discount supermarkets such as Aldi, Lidl and Netto. On 6 December 2006, The Guardian reported that further planned store openings were under review following poor sales in the existing outlets, while the range of branded products being carried was also being expanded due to customer demand. In January 2007 it was announced that the original Northampton trial store would close within a month after only 10 months of trading.

Asda Petrol

In 2012, Asda trialled a new standalone petrol filling station format (which means that they are not attached to or near an existing Asda store) at two locations in Sale, Greater Manchester and Leeds Bridge, which is located opposite head office. They include a small convenience store and click and collect facilities. The trial was a success and in 2014, a full roll out of this format was announced after a third site opened in Northolt, West London. In February 2015, 15 petrol filling stations were acquired from Rontec Ltd, and converted to the new format. Asda originally aimed to have at least 100 standalone forecourts by 2018. However, in October 2015, the company decided to slow the roll out down to address the problems associated with a major collapse of profits from its large store formats due to intense competition from its main rivals. But, the company is still continuing to add a combination of fully automated credit/debit card payment only petrol stations and petrol stations with traditional forecourt shops within the car parks of its existing store portfolio and to new store sites.

Asda was also the first supermarket chain in the United Kingdom to sell petrol at its old Halifax store in 1967, which at the time was located inside a converted mill in Battinson Road which burnt down during a major fire in 1982, and subsequently reopened as a purpose-built store in 1983, without the petrol station. The store moved to a different site in 2004. Back then its forecourt fuel was supplied by discount Russian supplier Nafta, because the major oil companies would not supply fuel to be sold at discount prices. From the early seventies, oil companies such as Mobil, Shell and Texaco supplied fuel to Asda as more supermarkets started to sell fuel from car park forecourts. Since the mid-1990s Asda has supplied, along with its main supermarket rivals, its own fuel delivered by its own tankers to its petrol station forecourts.  As of June 2018, Asda operates 319 petrol stations in total, 18 of which are standalone and the others mostly within the car park area of its stores.

Asda on the Move

A  petrol station convenience store format launched by EG Group in October 2020, soon after the Issa brothers' takeover of Asda. The first store opened at the Primley service station in Walsall with fifty outlets trading by September 2022.

Asda Express

In November 2022 Asda opened its first convenience stores in the Asda Express portfolio, with the initial stores located in Sutton Coldfield and Tottenham Hale.

Brands and services

Just Essentials by Asda

Just Essentials by Asda, formerly known as Asda Smartprice, is a no-frills private label trade name introduced in 2022.

Chosen By You
In 2010, Asda relaunched its mid-tier Asda own label brand. Asda announced that it would be phasing out the "Chosen By You" brand starting in 2016 and all products now show simply the "Asda" brand.

George clothing

Asda has its own range of clothing known as George, which was created and trialled in selected stores in 1989, and officially launched and rolled out to the main superstore estate in 1990. It replaced the older Asdale/Asda clothing labels of the 1970s and 1980s. This is marketed as quality fashion clothing at affordable prices. Walmart also sells the George brand in Argentina, Canada, China, India, Japan, Mexico, and the US (and in South Korea until Walmart pulled out of that market). George clothing is also sold at four stand alone dedicated stores in Malta, the first opening in 2013. George is a participant in the Sustainable Clothing Action Plan (SCAP), the ambition of which is to improve the sustainability of clothing throughout its lifecycle by helping to reduce the impacts of carbon, water and waste across the fashion sector. The label is named after George Davies, founder of Next, who was its original chief designer. Davies himself parted company with Asda in 2000 and is no longer associated with the brand.

In 2005, Asda stated that the George range was a £1.75 billion business, including sales from Walmart stores in the United States and Germany. Mintel estimate that George is the fourth largest retailer of clothing in the United Kingdom, after Marks & Spencer, the Arcadia Group and Next.

Asda was the first supermarket to stock wedding dresses. Part of the George line, they cost £60 while adult bridesmaid dresses ranged between £30 and £35, at launch.

Asda Mobile

Asda also operates a mobile phone network called Asda Mobile, which was launched in April 2007. This was previously provided in partnership with EE, but then in 2021 moved to Vodafone.

Asda Money
Asda has a financial services brand which offers products provided by other companies. Services offered include car insurance (in partnership with Vast Visibility Limited), credit cards (issued by Jaja Finance Ltd) and travel money bureaux (provided by Travelex). The financial services division of the organisation does not directly sell these services in store and instead uses the supplier of that product by telephone or online/postal application. Marketing and management of financial services is co-ordinated in house and many stores have a financial services co-ordinator, responsible for promoting the products and ensuring legal compliance. The Financial Services division is also responsible for gift cards, Christmas Saver and Business Rewards.

Medicine
Many larger stores have an on-site pharmacy. In July 2020, the company started an in-store virtual general practitioner service in partnership with health tech company Medicspot. It is to be launched at the Asda Supercentre in Stevenage.  Real-time diagnostics - a connected stethoscope, pulse oximeter, blood pressure monitor, contactless thermometer, and a close inspection camera - will be available in the pharmacy and patients can consult a GP remotely without the need to book an appointment in advance.  It was initially free, but after 4 July; a charge of £49 was introduced.  The ASDA pharmacy in Chelmsley Wood joined with local GP practices to deliver flu vaccinations from a van parked outside in October 2020.

Distribution
Asda has 25 distribution depots across the UK. Three of Asda's distribution centres (Rochdale CDC, Doncaster GM & Larne) are outsourced to Wincanton PLC.

In September 2021, it was announced that Asda would trial autonomous delivery vans in London in collaboration with Wayve, a UK-based autonomous mobility startup. The 12-month trial was agreed to take place in early 2022. The autonomous vans will operate with the supervision of a Wayve safety driver. Asda and Wayve aim to use their capabilities to bring autonomy into the online grocery space and look for ways to improve last-mile delivery with technology.

Employee relations
The company has featured prominently in lists of "Best companies to work for", appearing in second place in The Times newspaper list for 2005. It offers staff a discount of 10% on most items (exceptions include fuel, stamps, lottery, giftcards and tobacco related items).

The company was fined £850,000 in 2006 for offering 340 staff at a Dartford depot a pay rise in return for giving up a union collective bargaining agreement.
Poor relations continued as Asda management attempted to introduce new rights and working practices shortly thereafter at another centre in Washington, Tyne and Wear.

Some compromise was reached by June of that year, when a five-day strike was called off after Asda management and the GMB union reached an agreement.

Relations have improved since, with both Asda and the GMB marking the death of a worker together on Workers' Memorial Day in 2010.

In 2013, tens of thousands of Asda workers across the UK were hit with a tax complication because of an anomaly in Asda's payroll system. Asda employees receive their pay every four weeks, which meant, according to their spokesperson, that once every 20 years they are paid 14 times a year rather than 13. Whilst most companies handle this properly, Asda's payroll system did not, which meant that workers had, through no fault of their own, paid less tax for the year than they should have. This resulted in most full-time and a small number of part-time workers receiving a demand from HM Revenue & Customs for between £72 and £160.

In 2016, Asda became involved in a protracted equal pay dispute with its lower-paid shop staff, supported by GMB. 44,000 employees argued that mostly female shop staff could compare their pay with higher paid mostly male warehouse workers, under the Equal Pay Act 1970 and Equality Act 2010. In March 2021 the employees won a Supreme Court ruling upholding an earlier court ruling permitting the action, and enabling employment tribunal action to decide "equal value" claims. Asda stated "This ruling relates to one stage of a complex case that is likely to take several years to reach a conclusion." The claim could lead to about £500 million of compensation to lower paid employees.

Marketing

Campaigns
In the 'Asda price' campaign, customers tap their trouser pocket twice, producing a 'chinking' sound as the coins that Asda's low prices have supposedly left in their pockets knock together. The pocket tap ads were launched in 1977 and over the next 30 years, a range of celebrities have been "tappers", including from 1978, actors Richard Beckinsale, Paula Wilcox and James Bolam. And later, Julie Walters, and football player Michael Owen. In the late 1970s, adverts also included actor Leonard Rossiter.

In 1980, Carry On actress Hattie Jacques appeared in the advert as a school crossing patrol officer. Between 1981 and 1985, Asda used the slogan 'All Together Better' in conjunction with the 'Asda Price' pocket tap campaign in TV commercials and newspaper and magazine advertisements. When the new green capitalised ASDA logo started to appear from 1985, in early 1986 onwards and until early 1989, two slogans were used. The first, 'You'd be off your trolley to go anywhere else', was replaced in 1987 by 'One trip and you're laughing'.

In 1989, and until late 1991, before the reintroduction of the pocket tap campaign, advertising for Asda had featured the Fairground Attraction song "Perfect" with the slogan 'It 'Asda be Asda', which was based upon the lyrics of the song. When the Asda Price slogan was reintroduced in 1992, the strapline Pocket the Difference (capitalised) was added alongside it. This was replaced by 'Permanently Low Prices, Forever' in 1996.

From 1990 to 1991, Asda were the sponsors of Sheffield Wednesday F.C.

In the smiley face "rollback" campaign, also used by Walmart, a CGI smiley face bounced from price tag to price tag, knocking them down as customers watch. In 2006, Asda advertising was themed around singing children and the slogan "More for you for less".

For Christmas 2007, Asda reintroduced the "That's Asda price" slogan.

In 2008, the company refocused on price with a "Why Pay More?" campaign both on TV and in stores. Asda TV commercials in April 2009 focused on price comparisons between Asda and its rivals, using information from mySupermarket. The music being used in these adverts is the Billy Childish version of the classic Dad's Army theme tune. The old Asda jingle is not included in these, but appeared in a 2008 Christmas advert.

In August 2005, rival supermarket chain Tesco challenged Asda's ability to use the claim that it was the cheapest supermarket in the country, by complaining to the Advertising Standards Agency. The ASA upheld the complaint and ordered Asda to stop using it.

Energy drinks
In January 2018, Asda became one of the first supermarkets to ban selling energy drinks such as Red Bull to under-16s.

Ethical trading
Asda has signed up to the Ethical Trading Initiative (ETI) which respects workers' rights for freedom of association and a living wage. Implementing this initiative is difficult, however, because the concept of a living wage varies by country and the buying strategies of a major importer like Asda have an indirect impact on national minimum wages by obliging governments to set them low enough to stop businesses from going elsewhere. Industry pressure groups such as Labour Behind the Label and War on Want have argued that Asda and other budget retailers use unethical labour practices in the developing world to keep UK prices low.

The National Farmers' Union, representing UK farmers and growers, has argued that Asda and other major supermarkets have made large profits and kept consumer prices low "by squeezing suppliers' margins to the point where many of them have gone out of business". Asda have also refused to sign up to and donate to the Rana Plaza Donors Trust Fund, to donate compensation to the families of workers in Bangladesh killed when their factory building in Rana Plaza collapsed in 2013. Instead, Asda donated an undisclosed sum to the poverty relief charity Building Relationships Across Communities, who in turn pledged around £1.3m to the fund. Campaigners believe Asda is unwilling to set a precedent on indemnity pay for large scale industrial accidents.

In 2009, Asda's Valentine's Day roses, sold at £2 for a dozen, were said to be ethically sourced by the supermarket. This claim went against research carried out by War on Want.

Charities
Asda supports the following charities through its stores:
 BBC Children in Need - appeal organised by the BBC.
 Breast Cancer Care - women's cancer research.
 Everyman - men's cancer research.
 Asda Foundation - supporting local causes of Asda store workers, with projects supported across the UK.

Controversies

Dairy price fixing
In December 2007, Asda, Sainsbury's and other retailers and dairy firms admitted to the price fixing of dairy products between 2002 and 2003. The price
operation was calculated to have cost consumers around £270 million.

Asda commented, "Everyone at Asda regrets what happened, particularly as we are passionate about lowering prices. Our intention was to provide more money for dairy farmers, who were under severe financial pressure at the time." In total, Asda was fined £18.21 million by the Office of Fair Trading for its part in the cartel.

False and misleading advertising
In 2010, a national press ad for Asda on a double-page spread was headed "The big Asda Rollback" with headings stating "Lower prices on everything you buy, week in week out" with equal prominence to a column headed "Lower prices than any other supermarket"; that the arrows underneath the heading "Lower prices than any other supermarket" compared prices at Asda with prices at Sainsbury's, Tesco and Morrisons. The ASA ruled that in the context in which it appeared, it was ambiguous in that it could be interpreted either as referring to price reductions that had taken place within Asda or to price comparisons with the named competitors. In addition, because the ad did not explain that the price reductions had not necessarily taken place in the week that immediately preceded the ad, they concluded that the headings which stated the number of price reductions that had taken place in each product category were misleading. The ASA also concluded that the "Lower prices than any other supermarket" claim in the advert was misleading.

The ASA disagreed, and referred to the claim "Everything is at least half price!" was likely to imply to viewers that all toys were included in the sale. As all toys were not included in the sale, and in the absence of a qualifying statement, the ad was misleading.

The ASA ruled in 2011 that a television advertisement and two national press ads did not give sufficient prominence to the fact that exclusions applied.

Another advertisement from Asda, in which it featured World Cup related products and an Asda price guarantee was misleading as the World Cup related products were exclusive to Asda and not, therefore, available at Morrisons, Tesco or Sainsbury's.

In 2009, the ASA challenged whether a press ad which showed a large green arrow bearing down on a smaller yellow arrow with a crumpled tip and "Asda 2955 products cheaper" should set out how the general price claims made in the ads could be verified by consumers. Because it was not possible for consumers or competitors to check the products and prices used in the comparison using mySupermarket.co.uk, and because the ads did not set out how consumers and competitors could check that information for themselves, the ASA concluded that the ads did not satisfy the criterion of verifiability as defined in the 2006 European Court of Justice ruling, and were therefore in breach of the advertising Codes.

The ASA ruled that, due to the significant limitations and qualifications to the basis of the price comparison which were not included in the ad, or in the terms and conditions on Asda's website, the approach taken in making the comparisons was unfair and misleading.

A press ad, which appeared on 26 September 2011, was headlined "Only one supermarket is ... always 10% cheaper or we'll give you the difference guaranteed". However, at the top of the ad there was a banner that contained the claims "SALE", "Half Price", "Price Drop", "50% off", "1/2 price", "cheap" and that part of the headline claim "... always 10% cheaper" appeared in bold text in the middle of the ad. The ASA considered the banner, together with the headline was likely to be interpreted by consumers as claims that referred to the price of Asda goods. Since consumers could interpret that claim as one which guaranteed to refund the difference, should Asda not be the lowest on price, the ASA considered the presence of the claim "only one supermarket is always 10% cheaper" could create the impression that Asda were always 10% cheaper and would be interpreted as a 'lowest price' claim. The ASA therefore concluded that the advert was misleading. It also noted the footnote explaining the APG contradicted Asda's absolute claim that they were always the lowest on price, and that the disclaimer was also misleading.

In 2009, the ASA ruled that an advert for a proposed development in New Barnet was misleading, because it compared the floorspace of the development with the floorspace and additional buildings of a Sainsbury's store and with an unapproved Tesco plan.

2013 horsemeat scandal

In 2013, DNA tests revealed that horsemeat was present in Asda's Chosen By You fresh beef Bolognese sauce, the first instance during the 2013 meat adulteration scandal of horsemeat being found in fresh meat.

Award
 March 2009: Voted Innovative Employer of the Year, at the Oracle Retail Week Awards.

See also

 2007 UK petrol contamination
 European Marketing Distribution purchasing organization
 List of convenience stores
 List of department stores
 List of hypermarkets
 List of superstores
 List of supermarkets

References

External links

 

Dairy products companies of the United Kingdom
1949 establishments in England
1999 mergers and acquisitions
2021 mergers and acquisitions
Clothing retailers of the United Kingdom
Companies based in Leeds
Companies formerly listed on the London Stock Exchange
Retail companies established in 1949
Hypermarkets
Supermarkets of Northern Ireland
Supermarkets of the United Kingdom
Private equity portfolio companies